Walter Selvey was an English footballer who played for Derby County. His brother Scotch was also a footballer.

Born in Derby during the 1st quarter of 1866. Signed and played for Derby Midland in 1887. Left the following year for Derby County. Walter Selvey, playing as a forward, made his League debut on 22 September 1888 at County Ground, the then home of Derby County. The visitors were Accrington and the match ended as a 1–1 draw. Walter Selvey appeared in one of the 22 League matches played by Derby County during the 1888–89 season.

Selvey left Derby County in 1889 and joined Derby Junction. Walter Selvey died in 1944 aged 75/76.

References

1866 births
1944 deaths
Footballers from Derby
English footballers
Derby County F.C. players
English Football League players
Association football inside forwards